This is the discography for Dutch rock band The Gathering.

Studio albums

Live albums

Compilations

Video albums

Singles

EPs

Demos

Music videos

References 

Discographies of Dutch artists
Alternative rock discographies
Heavy metal group discographies